Mirti is an underground station serving Line C of the Rome Metro. The station is located under Piazza dei Mirti, in the Roman quarter of Prenestino-Centocelle.

Construction works started in 2007 and were finished in January 2015. The station opened in June 2015.

References

Rome Metro Line C stations
Railway stations opened in 2015
2015 establishments in Italy
Rome Q. XIX Prenestino-Centocelle
Railway stations in Italy opened in the 21st century